Alexander Wendt (born 12 June 1958) is an American political scientist who is one of the core social constructivist researchers in the field of international relations, and a key contributor to quantum social science. Wendt and academics such as Nicholas Onuf, Peter J. Katzenstein, Emanuel Adler, Michael Barnett, Kathryn Sikkink, John Ruggie, Martha Finnemore, and others have, within a relatively short period, established constructivism as one of the major schools of thought in the field. 

A 2006 survey of US and Canadian international relations scholars ranks Wendt as first among scholars who have "been doing the most interesting work in international relations in recent years. A 2011 survey of international relations scholars worldwide ranked Wendt first in terms of having "produced the best work in the field of IR in the past 20 years".

Biography 
Alexander Wendt was born in 1958 in Mainz in West Germany, attended high school in St. Paul, Minnesota and studied political science and philosophy at Macalester College before receiving his Ph.D. in political science from the University of Minnesota in 1989, studying under Raymond "Bud" Duvall. Wendt taught at Yale University from 1989 to 1997, at Dartmouth College from 1997 to 1999, at the University of Chicago from 1999 to 2004, and is currently the Ralph D. Mershon Professor of International Security at the Ohio State University.

Social Theory of International Politics 
Wendt's most widely cited work to date is Social Theory of International Politics (Cambridge University Press, 1999), which builds on and goes beyond his 1992 article "Anarchy is What States Make of It".  Social Theory of International Politics places itself as a response to Kenneth Waltz's 1979 work, Theory of International Politics, the canonical text of the neorealist school with Wendt centering states as the object of study and replicating Waltz's division between international relations and foreign policy. Like Waltz, Wendt believed that the actual production that individuates states happens through domestic processes that require a separate theory from international relations; thus: "Much of the construction is at the domestic level, as Liberals have emphasized, and a complete theory of state identity needs to have a domestic component." 

Wendt's book advances an argument of critical realism, and the ontological and methodological claims of constructivism. Critical realism, drawing upon the work of Roy Bhaskar (amongst others), seeks to explain un-observables within the world and constitutive questions of the world.

Constructivism, as imagined by Wendt, builds upon the work of Nicholas Onuf and Anthony Giddens, and argues for the mutual constitution of agents and structures, the historical contingency of cultures of anarchy, the role of constitutive and regulative norms in state behavior, the role of intersubjective social structures in identity, and the power of ideas. Anarchy, for Wendt, "has no logic apart from process and that interaction  structured, albeit not at a macro-level." There are three empirical cultures of anarchy in international relations: Hobbesian (where enmity dominates), Lockean (where rivalry dominates), and Kantian (where friendship dominates).

Quantum Mind and Social Science
Wendt's 2015 book Quantum Mind and Social Science (Cambridge University Press, 2015) examines the crossroads between quantum physics and social science. He advocates for panpsychism and quantum consciousness from a non-specialist perspective. The book is provocative in nature and has received varied reviews.

Mathias Albert in International Affairs explains the book as weakest in its attempts to link quantum physics to social science and behind the times in addressing the agent-structure problem, in addition to only marginally relating to international relations. The reviews within the book include Colin Wight's "Do I agree with it? No." and Jerome Busemeyer's "Some of these ideas may ultimately not be supported".

Works by Wendt

Books 
Social Theory of International Politics, Cambridge University Press, 1999, 
Quantum Mind and Social Science Unifying Physical and Social Ontology, Cambridge University Press, 2015,

Chapters in edited volumes 
"Institutions and International Order." 1989 (with Raymond Duvall) In Global Changes and Theoretical Challenges edited by E. Czempiel, and J. Rosenau. Lexington, Mass.: Lexington Books.
"The International System and Dependent Militarization" 1992 (with Michael Barnett), in Brian Job, ed., The Insecurity Dilemma: National Security of Third World States, Boulder: Lynne Rienner, pp. 97–119.
"Norms, Identity and Culture in National Security" 1996 (with Ronald Jepperson and Peter Katzenstein), in Katzenstein, ed., The Culture of National Security, New York: Columbia University Press, pp. 33–75.
"What is IR For?: Notes Toward a Post-Critical View," 2000 in Richard Wyn Jones, ed., Critical Theory and World Politics, Boulder: Lynne Rienner, pp. 205–224.
"Rationalism v. Constructivism: A Skeptical View." 2002 (with James Fearon)  In Handbook of International Relations, edited by W. Carlsnaes, T. Risse, and B. Simmons. London: Sage.
Social Theory' as Cartesian Science: An Auto-Critique from a Quantum Perspective." 2006 In Constructivism and International Relations, edited by Stefano Guzzini and Anna Leander. London: Routledge.
"Flatland: Quantum Mind and the International Hologram" 2010 In New Systems Theories of World Politics, edited by Mathias Albert, Lars-Erik Cederman and Alexander Wendt. New York: Palgrave Macmillan.

As editor
Wendt was coeditor of the journal International Theory.

References

Sources 
Copeland, Dale C., "The Constructivist Challenge to Structural Realism: A Review Essay" International Security Vol. 25, No. 2 (Autumn, 2000), pp. 187–212.

Wylie, Gillian "International Relations' via Media: Still under Construction" International Studies Review  Vol. 2, No. 3 (Autumn, 2000), pp. 123–126.

External links

American international relations scholars
Constructivist international relations scholars
Ohio State University faculty
Macalester College alumni
University of Minnesota College of Liberal Arts alumni
American political scientists
German emigrants to the United States
Living people
1958 births
Philosophers of social science